Windsor Cotton Mills Office is a historic office building located at Burlington, Alamance County, North Carolina. It was built in 1890, and is a two-story, four bay by three bay, brick office building.  It features a one-story hip-roofed porch that extends across most of the lower main facade.

It was added to the National Register of Historic Places in 1984.

References

Office buildings on the National Register of Historic Places in North Carolina
Office buildings completed in 1890
Buildings and structures in Burlington, North Carolina
National Register of Historic Places in Alamance County, North Carolina